The Variant Call Format (VCF) specifies the format of a text file used in bioinformatics for storing gene sequence variations. The format has been developed with the advent of large-scale genotyping and DNA sequencing projects, such as the 1000 Genomes Project. Existing formats for genetic data such as General feature format (GFF) stored all of the genetic data, much of which is redundant because it will be shared across the genomes. By using the variant call format only the variations need to be stored along with a reference genome.

The standard is currently in version 4.3, although the 1000 Genomes Project has developed its own specification for structural variations such as duplications, which are not easily accommodated into the existing schema.  There is also a genomic VCF (gVCF) extended format, which includes additional information about "blocks" that match the reference and their qualities. A set of tools is also available for editing and manipulating the files.

Example
 ##fileformat=VCFv4.3
 ##fileDate=20090805
 ##source=myImputationProgramV3.1
 ##reference=file:///seq/references/1000GenomesPilot-NCBI36.fasta
 ##contig=<ID=20,length=62435964,assembly=B36,md5=f126cdf8a6e0c7f379d618ff66beb2da,species="Homo sapiens",taxonomy=x>
 ##phasing=partial
 ##INFO=<ID=NS,Number=1,Type=Integer,Description="Number of Samples With Data">
 ##INFO=<ID=DP,Number=1,Type=Integer,Description="Total Depth">
 ##INFO=<ID=AF,Number=A,Type=Float,Description="Allele Frequency">
 ##INFO=<ID=AA,Number=1,Type=String,Description="Ancestral Allele">
 ##INFO=<ID=DB,Number=0,Type=Flag,Description="dbSNP membership, build 129">
 ##INFO=<ID=H2,Number=0,Type=Flag,Description="HapMap2 membership">
 ##FILTER=<ID=q10,Description="Quality below 10">
 ##FILTER=<ID=s50,Description="Less than 50% of samples have data">
 ##FORMAT=<ID=GT,Number=1,Type=String,Description="Genotype">
 ##FORMAT=<ID=GQ,Number=1,Type=Integer,Description="Genotype Quality">
 ##FORMAT=<ID=DP,Number=1,Type=Integer,Description="Read Depth">
 ##FORMAT=<ID=HQ,Number=2,Type=Integer,Description="Haplotype Quality">
 #CHROM POS      ID         REF   ALT    QUAL  FILTER   INFO                             FORMAT       NA00001         NA00002          NA00003
 20     14370    rs6054257  G     A      29    PASS    NS=3;DP=14;AF=0.5;DB;H2           GT:GQ:DP:HQ  0|0:48:1:51,51  1|0:48:8:51,51   1/1:43:5:.,.
 20     17330    .          T     A      3     q10     NS=3;DP=11;AF=0.017               GT:GQ:DP:HQ  0|0:49:3:58,50  0|1:3:5:65,3     0/0:41:3
 20     1110696  rs6040355  A     G,T    67    PASS    NS=2;DP=10;AF=0.333,0.667;AA=T;DB GT:GQ:DP:HQ  1|2:21:6:23,27  2|1:2:0:18,2     2/2:35:4
 20     1230237  .          T     .      47    PASS    NS=3;DP=13;AA=T                   GT:GQ:DP:HQ  0|0:54:7:56,60  0|0:48:4:51,51   0/0:61:2
 20     1234567  microsat1  GTC   G,GTCT 50    PASS    NS=3;DP=9;AA=G                    GT:GQ:DP     0/1:35:4        0/2:17:2         1/1:40:3

The VCF header 
The header begins the file and provides metadata describing the body of the file.

The header contains keywords that optionally semantically and syntactically describe the fields used in the body of the file, notably INFO, FILTER, and FORMAT (see below).

The columns of a VCF 
The body of VCF follows the header, and is tab separated into 8 mandatory columns and an unlimited number of optional columns that may be used to record other information about the sample(s). When additional columns are used, the first optional column is used to describe the format of the data in the columns that follow.

Common INFO fields 
Arbitrary keys are permitted, although the following sub-fields are reserved (albeit optional):

Any other info fields are defined in the .vcf header.

Common FORMAT fields 

Any other format fields are defined in the .vcf header.

See also 
 The FASTA format, used to represent genome sequences.
 The FASTQ format, used to represent DNA sequencer reads along with quality scores.
 The SAM format, used to represent genome sequencer reads that have been aligned to genome sequences.
 The GVF format (Genome Variation Format), an extension based on the GFF3 format.

 Global Alliance for Genomics and Health (GA4GH), the group leading the management and expansion of the VCF format. The VCF specification is no longer maintained by the 1000 Genomes Project.

 Human genome
 Human genetic variation
 Single Nucleotide Polymorphism (SNP)

References

External links 
 An explanation of the format in picture form
 

Biological sequence format